These are the official results of the Men's Decathlon competition at the 2001 World Championships in Edmonton, Alberta, Canada. There were a total number of 22 participating athletes, including five non-finishers. The competition started on Monday August 6, 2001 and ended on Tuesday August 7, 2001.

Medalists

Schedule

Monday, August 6

Tuesday, August 7

Records

Results

See also
 2000 Men's Olympic Decathlon
 2001 Hypo-Meeting
 2001 Decathlon Year Ranking
 Athletics at the 2001 Summer Universiade - Men's Decathlon
 2002 Men's European Championships Decathlon

References
 Results
 IAAF

D
Decathlon at the World Athletics Championships